Alena Paulenková (born 5 January 1979) is a Slovakian former professional tennis player.

Born in Zvolen, Paulenková reached a best singles ranking of 392 in the world during her career and won two ITF titles, both in 1997.

Paulenková made her WTA Tour main-draw debut in the doubles at the 1999 Slovak Indoor, where she and partner Radka Zrubáková were beaten in the first round by eventual champions, Kim Clijsters and Laurence Courtois. She featured in the doubles at Bratislava again in the 2000 edition, as a main-draw qualifier, partnering Martina Suchá.

ITF finals

Singles: 2 (2–0)

Doubles: 11 (3–8)

References

External links
 
 

1979 births
Living people
Slovak female tennis players
Sportspeople from Zvolen
20th-century Slovak women